The Korfball European Cup was the main annual korfball competition for clubs in Europe. The first Europa Cup took place in 1967 in London (England), with two teams from the Netherlands, Belgium and the host nation England. Ons Eibernest from The Hague won the first tournament. The tournament was won exclusively by clubs from the Netherlands and Belgium, and Mitcham (England) and Adler Rauxel (Germany) were the only clubs outside Netherlands and Belgium to reach the final. In January 2022, the IKF announced that the IKF Europa Cup and IKF Europa Shield would be replaced by the IKF Europe Korfball Champions League for the 2022-23 Season.

History

Record tables

References

External links
 International Korfball Federation website

 
European Cup
European international sports competitions
Korfball in Europe
Recurring sporting events established in 1967
1967 establishments in Europe
Multi-national professional sports leagues